Oaks Card Club is a card club in Emeryville, California.

History
 The club was founded in 1898, in the city of Emeryville, California. The club's record jackpot came in 2015 at $200,000 worth. In 2016 its employees earned $14 an hour.

References 

Companies based in Emeryville, California
Entertainment companies established in the 1930s
1930s establishments in California